Millington Hall is a historic Grade II listed building in Cheadle Hulme, Stockport, England, constructed in 1683. It is on Station Road next to the Methodist Church. The building became a restaurant in the 1960s, before being converted and reopened in 2004 as a public house called the John Millington.

References

Grade II listed buildings in the Metropolitan Borough of Stockport
Cheadle Hulme
Buildings and structures completed in 1683